Chharchha is a census town in Koriya District  in the state of Chhattisgarh, India.

Demographics
 India census, Chharchha had a population of 15,352. Males constitute 54% of the population and females 46%. Chharchha has an average literacy rate of 69%, higher than the national average of 59.5%; with male literacy of 77% and female literacy of 59%. 13% of the population is under 6 years of age.
Chharchha is basically a colony developed by SECL (a subsidiary of Coal India Limited). Chharchha is famous for its coal production from its two mines, Chharchha East and Chharchha West.

References

Cities and towns in Koriya district